Atrophaneura schadenbergi is a species of butterfly in the family Papilionidae. It is endemic to the Philippines.

References

Lepidoptera of the Philippines
Taxonomy articles created by Polbot
Taxobox binomials not recognized by IUCN
Butterflies described in 1891